Jack Comber (15 April 1919 – 23 October 1992) was an Australian politician. Born in Broken Hill, New South Wales, he was educated at St Kevin's College in Melbourne before becoming a shop assistant. He served in the military 1941–46 and returned to become a store manager and insurance consultant. In 1961, he was elected to the Australian House of Representatives as the Labor member for the Queensland seat of Bowman, defeating sitting MP Malcolm McColm. Comber was defeated in 1963 and retired from politics. He died in 1992.

References

Australian Labor Party members of the Parliament of Australia
Members of the Australian House of Representatives for Bowman
Members of the Australian House of Representatives
1919 births
1992 deaths
People educated at St Kevin's College, Melbourne
20th-century Australian politicians